Inverness Club is a private golf club in Toledo, Ohio.

Opened in 1903, the club has hosted four U.S. Opens, two PGA Championships, two NCAA Men's Championships, and the Solheim Cup. Inverness is the only club to have hosted the U.S. Open, U.S. Amateur, U.S. Senior Open, and U.S. Junior Amateur Championships. From 1935 to 1954, it also hosted the Inverness Invitational Four-Ball. Byron Nelson served as the club's head golf professional from 1940 to 1944 and considered it his "home course." S.P. Jermain, the club's founder and first Board President, was credited with conceiving the idea for the Ryder Cup. The championship course was designed by architect Donald Ross.

Inverness Club is set to host the 2027 U.S. Women's Open and the 2029 U.S.  Amateur.

History
Inverness was founded in 1903, when many of Toledo's wealthiest citizens purchased a parcel of land and built a nine-hole golf course.  The course was eventually expanded to 18 holes.  In 1916, the club hired Donald Ross to construct a championship-caliber golf course, which was finished by the end of 1918. In his unpublished book, Golf Has Never Failed Me, Ross discussed the design of Inverness and only six other courses, out of the hundreds he designed.

Before 1920 in the United States, golf professionals were prohibited from entering the clubhouse, as they were once seen as little more than servants to their patron members of the country club. As professional golf tournaments began to appear in the early part of the 20th century, the visiting pros were treated the same as the home pros.

By 1920, attitudes had begun to change. Sylvanus Pierre Jermain, considered "the father of public golf in Toledo", lobbied the USGA and the members of Inverness to agree to allowing all players, including pros, into the clubhouse at the upcoming 1920 U.S. Open. Both parties agreed, and Inverness thus became the first golf club in the U.S. to allow pros in the clubhouse.

As a gift for the boldness and generosity Inverness had shown, Walter Hagen gathered other professional golfers when the U.S. Open returned to Inverness in 1931 so that a gift could be purchased for the club.  Together they purchased a grandfather clock for the club house which is still housed there today. On the brass plate of the clock, this inscription was written:

God measures men by what they are
Not by what they in wealth possess
This vibrant message chimes afar
The voice of Inverness

Byron Nelson was the head professional at Inverness Club from 1940 to 1944. He considered Inverness his home course and credits his time there for his record breaking performance, winning 18 of 35 PGA tournaments including 11 in a row, in 1945. Lloyd Gullickson became the head professional at Inverness Club, succeeding Nelson. Gullickson remained at Inverness as the head professional until his retirement in 1965. Herman Lang, who was the first assistant to Nelson in 1941, was the head pro from 1966-1980.  

In preparation for championships, the course has been renovated four times. In 2016, Inverness Club engaged golf course architect, Andrew Green, who carefully researched original drawings and historic photography to restore the artistry of Donald Ross's design. In addition, Green modernized tee boxes and bunkering systems that are fitting to today's championship courses. Green's design has restored Ross’s classic championship design, with Inverness Club now playing over 7,700 yards. 

Inverness was ranked #47 on Golfweek Magazine's America's Top 200 Classic Courses and #88 by Golf Digest.

Scorecard

Tournaments
Winners of major tournaments held at Inverness Club include:

U.S. Open
1920 – Ted Ray
1931 – Billy Burke (holds records:  winning score 589, 144 holes)
1957 – Dick Mayer
1979 – Hale Irwin

U.S. Amateur
1973 – Craig Stadler

PGA Championship
1986 – Bob Tway
1993 – Paul Azinger

U.S. Senior Open
2003 – Bruce Lietzke
2011 – Olin Browne

U.S. Junior Amateur
2019 – Preston Summerhays

Solheim Cup
2021 –  Europe

Future championships
2027 U.S. Women's Open
2029 U.S. Amateur

The club also hosted the NCAA Men's Golf Championship in 1944 and 2009.

References

External links

Inverness Club

Sports in Toledo, Ohio
National Register of Historic Places in Lucas County, Ohio
Golf clubs and courses in Ohio
Golf clubs and courses designed by Donald Ross
Clubhouses on the National Register of Historic Places in Ohio
Tourist attractions in Toledo, Ohio
Historic districts on the National Register of Historic Places in Ohio
Solheim Cup venues
Sports venues completed in 1903
1903 establishments in Ohio
Golf clubs and courses on the National Register of Historic Places